Prosopocera valida is a species of beetle in the family Cerambycidae. It was described by Per Olof Christopher Aurivillius in 1927. It is known from Sierra Leone and the Democratic Republic of the Congo.

References

Prosopocerini
Beetles described in 1927